The Army Venture Capital Corporation (AVCC) is the venture capital arm of the United States Army.

History 
The AVCC was established by the U.S. Congress in 2002 with an initial funding allocation of twenty-five million dollars. The organization has achieved limited success in accomplishing it's stated goals since its founding.

See Also 
Defense Innovation Unit, a similar organization launched to assist the Department of Defense in leveraging commercial markets.
In-Q-Tel, a similar organization chartered through the CIA.

References

Further reading 
 
 

Venture capital firms of the United States